The Babadag Wind Farm (also referred as Renewable Energy Production Facilities in Babadag) is a wind farm in Babadag, Tulcea County, Romania. The wind farm is owned and operated by Eviva Nalbant, a subsidiary of Portuguese multinational company Martifer.  The project was developed as a joint implementation project.  The wind park was financed with €23 million loan from Banca Comercială Română.

The project started in 2007 when Eviva Nalbant conducted a preliminary wind resource assessment and pre-feasibility assessment. The concession contract with Babadag Municipality was signed in September 2007. In 2008, a turbine supply contract was signed with Suzlon Energy. In April 2009, the project was revised and optimized based on on-site measurement data. A construction permit was issued in March 2010 and construction started in April 2010.

It contains two locations: Babadag I (16 turbines) and Babadag II (four turbines). Originally, the project was to include 48 wind turbines with a nominal capacity 1 MW each. However, the project was delayed and it was later change to have 20 Suzlon S88 turbines with a nameplate capacity of 2.1 MW each.

References

Wind farms in Romania